Uloma is a rural locality (a selo) in Korotovskoye Rural Settlement, Cherepovetsky District, Vologda Oblast, Russia. The population was 8 as of 2002.

Geography 
Uloma is located 60 km southwest of Cherepovets (the district's administrative centre) by road. Zarechye is the nearest rural locality.

References 

Rural localities in Cherepovetsky District